The Hebberley Shield is a trophy awarded to the winning boat of 8 in the men's rowing competition at the annual New Zealand University Games. The award dates back to 1928. 

The shield was carved by Thomas Henry Hebberley of the Dominion Museum.

History

Running total

1928 Victoria F. H. Mullins (stroke), K. F. Crease, F. M. Bell, A. Taylor, C. Steele, S. G. Rees, G. Thomas, R. Moffat, T. Kearns (cox), E. Diehl (coach)
1929 Victoria   
1930 Canterbury T. H. McCombs (stroke), H. C. Holland, C. F. J. Gilby, S. B. Wallace, T. R. Evans, H. Waymouth, D. M. Patterson, V. A. Smith, R. E. Garrett (cox), A. R. Douglas (coach) 
1931 Victoria   
1932 Canterbury H. Waymouth (stroke), S. B. Wallace, M. Hunter, H. R. Watts, T. R. Evans, R. M. Simmers, D. M. Patterson, L. L. Hosking, E. H. Carew (cox), F. H. Brown (coach) 
1933 Canterbury L. L. Hosking (stroke), H. R. Watts, M. Hunter, R. M. Simmers, T. R. Evans, H. D. Nelson, T. H. McCombs, D. M. Patterson, E. H. Carew (cox) F. H. Brown (coach) 
1934 Auckland O. J. C. Mason (stroke), J. C. McComish, S. B. Sheath, H. T. Lee, P. Shirley, J. A. Parsons, J. P. Hooper, D. Robinson, E. Henderson (cox), T Marshall (coach) 
1935 Auckland O. J. C. Mason (stroke), H. T. Lee, J. P. Hooper, G. C. Dalton, P. F. Shirley, E. H. Sealy, H. T. Jellie, J. A. Parsons, E. Henderson (cox), V. Smith (coach) 
1936 Canterbury H. A. Eaton, S. M. Gray, M. T. Hunter, H. Millard, R. W. K. White, W. M. Graham, J. O. Renaut, J. M. Steeds, A. J. Nicholson (cox) 
1937 Victoria K. W. Barnes (stroke), F. G. Bowling, R. P. Hansen, J. B. Bullock, N. M. Rose, R. J. McElroy, G. C. Broad, A. R. Burge, F. Stafford (cox), E. J. Barnes (coach) 
1938 Victoria G. C. Broad (stroke), R. P. Hansen, N. M. Rose, J. B. Bullock, R. E. Hermans, T. S. Mahood, G. T. Ryan, A. R. Bridge, F. D. Stafford (cox) 
1939 Otago A. N. White, F. J. Cairns, R, B, G, Cook, M. G. O’Callaghan, F. J. Gruar, E. L. Gillies, S. White, J. N. Ramsay, B. H. R. Hill (cox), J. P. Vallis (coach) 
1940 Canterbury L. G. Bell (stroke), J. M. Steeds, W. W. Young, P. H. Tovey, E. W. Wright, A. G. Hunter, W. Harris, M. L. Newman, A. H. H. Martin (cox), M. Hunter (coach) 
1941 Canterbury WARTIME FOURS: A. T. Johns (stroke), E. W. Wright, N. V. Ryder, W. Harris 
1942   World War II 
1943   World War II 
1944   World War II 
1945 Canterbury J. W. Wilson (stroke), G. A. Drummond, E. K. Millett, B. J. Walker, K. G. Knight, A. V. Hatrick, H. G. Caplen, K. Douglass, J. C. Muir (cox) 
1946 Otago M. Walters (stroke), G. N. Wimsett, E. T. MacDonald, D. J. Dobson, H. Culter, N. A. Woods, L. S. James, H. K. Watt, H. B. F. Harris (cox) 
1947     
1948 Auckland A. W. Grant (stroke), D. G. Croot, K. Ashby, M. B. Antonievich, D. Kronfeld, K. S. James, D. P. Walls, J. J. Molloy, Miss N. S. T. Croot (cox) 
1949     
1950 Canterbury N. M. West (stroke), N. W. Glasgow, F. J. Connell, R. F. Moginie, P. J. A. Page, J. G. Samuel, R. D. Beckwith, K. M. Newberry, E. Gardner (cox) 
1951 Auckland R. Tonkin (stroke), D. Bodley, I. Mercep, V. Blaskovich, R. Mlicich, R. T. Sheil, R. Anderson, P. Harpham, N. Lynch (cox) 
1952 Auckland R. Tonkin (stroke), V. Blaskovich, I. Mercep, R. T. Sheil, J. Kemp, K. Ashby, I. Stanich, P. Butcher, N. Lynch (cox) 
1953 Auckland R. Anderson (stroke), V. Blaskovich, I. Mercep, R. Sheil, C. Martin, P. Irvine, R. Stanich, M. Worseldine, N. Lynch (cox) 
1954    
1955 Otago D. MacDonald (stroke), J. van der Leigh, K. McCredie, M. Irwin, J. Sinclair, R. Moginie, I. Hannon, J. McLaurin 
1956 Canterbury F. Harland (stroke), W. Jones, B. Jones, R. Barrett, E. McCalam, J. Sewell, P. Spooner, M. Worseldine, B. Armstrong (cox) 
1957 Otago: D.Prowse [cox]; M Gill [strole]; W Warden; D MacDonald; M Irwin; J Makim; D Calder; J Braithwaite; J Scott; G Thorn [coach]    
1958 Otago: J Sinclair [stroke]; W Warden; C Hurring; M Irwin; D Davidson; D Calder; J Scott; C Harper; G Thorn [coach]    
1959 Otago: M Gill [stroke]; C Harper; D Davidson; D Calder; D Rae; P Parkinson; W Tongue; J Scott; G Thorn [coach]   
1960 Canterbury K. H. B. McKinnon (stroke), D. McDonnell, C. J. H. O. Tobin, F. J. Grant, H. J. Cranfield, W. A. Warden, D. T. Riley, R. B. McCorkindale 
1961 Auckland N. Paton (stroke), T. Wallace, R. Brown, J. Potter, G. Cave, A. Wilson, M. Walker, D. Arcus, ??? (cox), K. Ashby (coach) 
1962 Canterbury   Tim Dobbie (stroke), Don Holden, Dave Dearsley, Tom Just, Brian Walford, Barry Hill, Tony Hinkley, Owen Burton, Chris Timms (Cox), Norm West (Coach)
1963     
1964 Canterbury T. Dobbie (stroke), W. Taylor, T. Just, J. Hunter, N. Smith, B. Walford, W. Mills, I. Riley 
1965     
1966     
1967 Victoria R. J. Joyce (stroke), P. G. MacCauley, P. W. Wear, J. G. Gibbons, O. R. Gilbert, R. G. Trott, J. R. Pope, B. J. Brown, B.A.Jones (cox/coach) 
1968 Victoria   
1969 Canterbury D. Jack (stroke), A. Winwood, D. Lindstrom, R. Pickrill, G. Smith, D. Rawson, I. Brownlee, R. Cornes, J. Harding (cox) 
1970 Canterbury D. Jack (stroke), A. Winwood, G. Smith, R. Warren, T. Coker, R. Pickrill, A. Hughes-Johnson, D. Rawson, J. Harding (cox) 
1971 Canterbury P. M. Vinnie (stroke), R. Pickrill, T. Coker, P. Walker, B. Rowe, V. Allen, P. O’Connor, D. Rawson, J. Harding (cox) 
1972 Lincoln D. Nicholls (stroke), G. Wright, J. Glenn, E. Tye, A. Craw, P. Hodges, R. Phillips, P. Young, M. Middleton (cox) 
1973 Canterbury B. Allen (stroke), B. Rowe, T. Coker, A. Bowker, G. Pearce, D. Littlejohn, C. Mayhew, S. Mossman, W. Glassey (cox) 
1974 Canterbury B. Allen, B. Rowe, G. Pierce, C. Hannah, C. Thorsen, G. Loe, A. Stewart, S. Mossman, R. McCall (cox), W. H. Barker (coach) 
1975 Otago G. Hill, M. Holloway, J. Sutherland, M. Matich, B. Allen, A. Brook, C. Morgan, A. Kriechbaum, B. Cameron (cox) 
1976 Otago M. Holloway (stroke), M. Matich, J. Sutherland, A. Brook, J. Gee, B. Allen, L. Eade, A. Kriechbaum, M. Metzger (cox) 
1977 Canterbury B. C. Allen (stroke), A. B. Brook, C. R. Thorsen, A. J. Stewart, C. J. Mayhew, D. R. Manning, C. C. Duncaan, M. J. Meates, P. E. Gamble (cox) 
1978     
1979 Otago P. Tong (stroke), A. Morris, P. Cossens, A. Speed, B. Cooper, N. Gilchrist, M. Gimlett, M. Seeley, M. Rees (cox) 
1980 Otago P. Tong (stroke), R. Bruce, P. Cossens, A. Speed, B. Cooper, M. Gimlett, P. Morrison, A. Morris, M. Rees (cox)
1981 Otago P. Morrison (stroke), R. Bruce, P. Cossens, M. Gimblett, B. Cooper, A. Speed, S. Beck, A. Morris, M. Rees (cox) 
1982 Auckland M. Eliassen, A. Bruce, E. Verdonk, S. Ashby, T. Lawton, R. Williams, D. Craig, P. Frederickson, A. Bowman (cox) 
1983 Otago S. Beck, A. Rowe, T. Signal, M. Bamford, B. Cooper, M. Gimblett, B. Smith, S. Borlase, S. Stables (cox) 
1984 Otago B. Smith, I. McVicar, T. Signal, M. Tamis, A. Mahon, W. Gilbertson, T. Hurring, D. Caughey, M. Rees (cox) 
1985 Canterbury A. Skelton, M. Buckeridge, S. Borlase, M. Tamis, A. McQuarry, C. Langedale, R. Boswell, A. Burns, M. Rees (cox) 
1986 Canterbury K. Meates, R. Coorey, S. Borlase, M. Tamis, A. Parkyn, K. Eden, A. Skelton, A. Burns, M. Rees (cox) 
1987 Canterbury A. Skelton, A. Armstrong, S. Borlase, G. Lannen, J. Meates, S. Brownlee, G. Perry, M. Buckeridge, T. Brinkman (cox) 
1988 Canterbury G. Perry, K. Calvert, A. Parkyn, S. Borlase, A. Skelton, I. Jones, A. Blake, G. Strang, D. McPherson (cox), D. Burrowes (coach) 
1989 Canterbury S. Borlase, I. Jones, A. Blake, G. Strang, J. Wilkinson, A. Taylor, G. Lannam, D. Rutherford, B. King (cox), D. Burrowes (coach) 
1990 Canterbury G. Perry, N. McGowan, S. Brownlee, R. Pritchard, A. Berry, P. Peoples, R. Syme, A. Brown, M. Levy (cox) 
1991 Otago Michael Lightbourne, Michael Thompson, Warren Campbell, Alex Berry, Brett Smith, Brice Williams, Marcel Grey, Richard Lascelles, Alexandra Dodd (cox) 
1992 Canceled due to meningitis scare
1993 Otago M. Hindmarsh, A. Matheson, B. Sowman, M. Talbot, G. Stewart, R. Thomson, C. Vincent, A. Murdoch, H. Graham (cox) 
1994 Auckland I. McAlley, D. Gierra, L. Clemment, A. McKenzie, S. Lockhart, S. Dunlop, R. Boyes, B. Erskine, J. Kingston (cox) 
1995 Otago G. Stewart, B. Sowman, M. Straker, P. Warwick, T. Hinds, D. Foggo, G. Sinclair, G. Garthwaite, B. Wilson (cox), F. Strachan (coach) 
1996 Otago B. Sowman, G. Stewart, M. Straker, D. Foggo, T. Hinds, N. Twaddle, G. Sinclair, A. Cotter, B. Wilson (cox) 
1997 Otago Gary Stewart, Anton Cotter, Matt Straker, Dan Foggo, John Turnbull, Nathan Twaddle, Glen Sinclair, Richard Hollebon, George Grove (cox), Dave Hanan (coach) 
1998 Canterbury Ben Forrest, Chris Flanagan, Foss Shanahan, Aaron Hurst, Harvey Tyler, David Carr-Smith, Christian Lehndorf, Chris Brown, Emily Worsp (cox), Charlie Flanagan (coach) 
1999 Canterbury Ben Forrest, Aaron Hurst, James Reid, Foss Shanahan, Simon Hoadley, David Carr-Smith, Christian Lehndorf, Chris Brown, Ginny Hamilton (cox), Charlie Flanagan (coach)
2000 Canterbury Glen Twining (str), Chris Brown, Foss Shanahan, Aaron Hurst, Christian Lehndorf, David Carr-Smith, Heath Turnbull, Simon Hoadley, Virginia Hamilton (cox) 
2001 Canterbury Glen Twining (str), Chris Brown, James Lucas, Carl Meyer, Ben Forrest, David Carr-Smith, Henry Giesen, Ben Hannifin, Virginia Hamilton (cox), Richard Le Seles and Ben Forrest (coaches) 
2002 Otago Grant Carroll (stroke), Andrew Crosland, Bruce Magee, Nick Barton, Paul Willets, Sam Cooper, Fraser Overwheel, Rob Creasy, Annie Robinson(cox), Glen Sinclair (coach)
2003 Otago Andrew Crosland (stroke), Nick Barton, Bruce Magee, Andre Sintmaartensdyk, Howie Ross, Richard Wing, Rob Creasy, Brooke Ebbett, Annie Robinson (cox), Glen Sinclair (coach) 
2004 Otago Grant Carroll (stroke), Scott Gundesen, Hamish Bond, Sam Morrison, Peter Benny, Andrew Crosland, Kirk Archibald, Hamish Rowlands, Paul McGimpsey (cox), Nick Phillips (coach)
2005 Otago Brooke Ebbett (stroke), Adam Garden, Andrew Crosland, Nathan Cohen, Matt Archibald, Hamish Rowlands, Matt McGovern, Miles Bowker, Paul McGimpsey (cox), Nick Phillips (coach)
2006 Otago  Matt McGovern (stroke), Adam Garden, Will Joyce, Sam Morrison, Jamie Twigg, Nathan Cohen, Matt Archibald, Justin Evans, Paul McGimpsey (cox), Nick Phillips (coach)
2007 Otago Matt McGovern (Stroke), Adam Garden, Jamie Twigg, Sam O'Connor, Elliot Riley, Campbell Lowe, Brooke Ebbett, Justin Evans, Michael Dessoulavy (cox), Nick Phillips (coach)
2008 Otago Jamie Orsbourn (Stroke), Matthew Adam, Matt McGovern, Campbell Lowe, Brad Ross, Dougal MacDuff, Richard Sharp, Todd Hale, Michael Dessoulavy (cox), Nick Phillips (coach)
2009 Otago Mark O'Connor, Alistair Bond, Jamie Orsbourn, Scott van den Bosch, William Shaw, Campbell Lowe, Matthew Adam, Todd Hale, Michael Dessoulavy (cox), Nick Phillips (coach)
2010 Canterbury Andrew King, Andrew O'Connor, Armin Svoboda, Ben Wooding, David Hatton, Hamish Borowczyk, Todd Petherick, Will Meates, Isabel McLernon (coxswain), Dale Maher (coach)
2011 Waikato Shaun Kirkham, Andrew Myers, Giacomo Thomas, Will Meates, Logan Roger, Chris Morrison, Matthew Glenn, Finian Scott, Lindsay McCowan (cox), Mike Gilbert (coach)
2012 Auckland Jefferson Haldane, Louis van Velthooven, Isaac Grainger, Johnathan Tait, Joseph Nihotte, Craig Little, Chris Rolls, Jordan Stanley, Corina Chilibeck (cox), Sam Heveldt (coach)
2013 Otago  Scott Green (Stroke), Andrew Potter, Corey McAffery, Liam Kettle, Adrian Riepen, Bryce Abernethy, Ryan Kelleher, Andrew Annear,  Sachin Arulambalam (cox), Justin Evans & Matt Smaill (coaches)
2014 Otago  Bryce Abernethy (Stroke), Corey McCaffrey, Andrew Potter, Ryan Kelleher, Mark Alm, Adrian Riepen, Scott Barnsdale,  Elliot Harvey,  Sachin Arulambalam (cox), Glen Sinclair (coach)
2015 Waikato  Cameron Bartley (Stroke), Charles Rogerson, Logan Rodger, Richard Power, Elliot Rhodes, Peter Byllemos, Martyn O'Leary, Joshua Earl, Caitlin Lawry (cox), Matt Cameron (coach)
2016 Otago Phillip Wilson (Stroke), Andrew Potter, Tom Clyma, Hugo Elworthy, Sean Ducray, Sam Johnston, Simon Early, Bryce Abernethy, Sachin Arulambalam (cox), Scott Gullery (coach)
2017 Otago Scott Bezett (Stroke), Sam Wilkins, Simon Early, Tom Cummack, Riley Bruce, Ari Palsson, Caleb Dallow, Corey Lewis, Kate Bolland (cox), Scott Gullery & Nick Phillips (coaches)
2018 Waikato Drikus Conradie (stroke), Thomas Bedford, James Hall, Joshua Earl, Fergus McSwiney, James Brott, Joel Engelke, Daniel Tomlinson, Sarah Best (cox), Richard Power (Coach)
2019 Waikato Jack Ready (stroke), Charlie Rogerson, Josh Toa, Tracie McLaren-Taplin, Joel Engelke, Martyn O'Leary, Jordon Gasson, Daniel Tomlinson, Ben Tyson (cox), Laura Jefferies (Coach)
2020 Cancelled due to COVID-19 Pandemic
2021 Canterbury Nathan Luff (stroke), Hamish qMaxwell, George Howat, Jostien Leota-Butler, Murphy Waters, Hunter Pethers-Boak, Niko Kumarich, Will Johnston, Blake Campbell (cox)
2022 Canterbury Ned Botherway(stroke), Oli Welch, Flynn Watson, Zack Rumble, Hunter Pethers-Boak, Jack Chapman, George Johnson, Nathan Luff, Annabelle Scott (cox)

References

Rowing in New Zealand
New Zealand sports trophies and awards